Ho Ching (born 27 March 1953) is a Singaporean businesswoman who has been serving as the director of Temasek Trust since 2021. She is the wife of incumbent Prime Minister Lee Hsien Loong.

Ho joined Temasek Holdings as a director in January 2002. She became its executive director in May 2002 and was appointed as the chief executive officer by Prime Minister Goh Chok Tong in January 2004. 

As of 2020, she is listed as the 30th Most Powerful Woman in the World by Forbes.

Early life and education
Ho was born on 27 March 1953 in Singapore. She attended Crescent Girls' School and National Junior College—where she became one of the top students for the A Level examinations in her cohort and was named Student of the Year, before graduating from the University of Singapore (now the National University of Singapore) in 1976 with a Bachelor of Engineering with first class honours degree in electrical engineering. 

She subsequently went on to complete a Master of Science degree in electrical engineering at Stanford University in 1982.

Career 
Ho started her career as an engineer with the Ministry of Defence of Singapore in 1976. In 1983, she became the Director of Defence Materials Organisation, the procurement agency of the ministry and concurrently held the position of deputy director of Defence Science Organisation.

Ho joined Singapore Technologies in 1987 as deputy director of engineering and took on various senior responsibilities before becoming its president and chief executive officer in 1997. She is credited with repositioning and growing the group in the five years that she led it. For instance, she was the architect for the formation and listing of Singapore Technologies Engineering in 1997 and served as its first chairperson.

Ho joined Temasek Holdings as a director in January 2002 and became its executive director in May 2002.

Ho assumed the role of chief executive officer of Temasek on 1 January 2004. She is widely credited with transforming Temasek, an investment company owned by the Government of Singapore, from a Singapore-focused firm into an active investor in Asia and the world.

Ho has served as chairperson of the Singapore Institute of Standards and Industrial Research, and as deputy chairperson of the Productivity and Standards Board, and the Economic Development Board.

Ho stepped down as CEO and executive director on October, 1 2021, being succeeded by Dilhan Pillay Sandrasegara, who will continue to concurrently hold his current appointment as chief executive of Temasek International. The same day, she was appointed as a director of Temasek Trust, and will succeed S. Dhanabalan in the following year as chairperson on 1 April 2022.

Honours

National 
For her public service, she was conferred the 

  Public Administration Medal (silver, 1985) 
  Public Service Star (1996) award by the Singapore Government.

Foreign 

  First Class of The Most Exalted Order of Sultan Ibrahim Johor – Dato' Sri Mulia Sultan Ibrahim Johor (SMIJ), which carries the title Datin Paduka (May 6, 2022) 

  First Class of The Most Distinguished Order of Paduka Seri Laila Jasa – Darjah Paduka Seri Laila Jasa (PSLJ), which carries the title Datin Paduka Seri Laila Jasa (July 16, 2022).

Academic 

 In 1995, Ho was conferred the National University of Singapore's Distinguished Engineering Alumnus Award. 
 She is also an honorary fellow of the Institution of Engineers, Singapore.

Others 
Ho has appeared in many rankings of the most powerful and influential people in the world. In 2007, Ho was picked as one of the "100 most influential men and women" who shaped the world by Time magazine. In 2007, Forbes magazine ranked her 3rd in its annual list of the world's most powerful women, behind German Chancellor Angela Merkel and China's Vice-Premier Wu Yi. Ho had climbed 33 spots from 36th place in the previous year's list.

In 2011, Ho was included in the '50 Most Influential' ranking by Bloomberg Markets magazine.

In 2013, Ho was ranked ninth on the Public Investor 100 ranking compiled by the Sovereign Wealth Fund Institute.

In 2014, she was listed as the 59th most powerful woman in the world by Forbes. In June, Ho was also awarded the 2014 Asian Business Leaders Award. The annual Asia House award recognises individuals who embody the 'Servant Leader' – economic success and professional excellence accompanied by moral leadership and service to society. Asia House is a centre of expertise on Asia and the leading pan-Asian organisation in the UK. She became the 30th most powerful woman in 2016.

In 2019, she ranked No. 23 in the Power Women 2019 of Forbes list, while in 2020 she ranked 30th again.

Philanthropy 
In her personal capacity, Ho supports various community service and charitable organisations.  She has particular interest in special needs education, healthcare and the welfare and development of children.  She is the patron of Assisi Hospice, and the founding chairman of Trailblazer Foundation Ltd, an IPC charity which provides funding for education, health, sports and community welfare. In March 2014, Ho was inducted into the Singapore Council of Women's Organisations' Singapore Women's Hall of Fame, which honours outstanding women of Singapore.

In August 2016, Ho received a positive reception when on a state visit to the White House to mark 50 years of bilateral relations between the US and Singapore, she carried a pouch designed by an autistic student from Pathlight School (under its Artist Development Program). Ho is an advisor to the Autism Resource Centre (ARC), a non-profit charity in charge of Pathlight School, and had acquired the pouch at an ARC fundraising event. Ho is also a patron of the Autism Association of Singapore.

Personal life 
Ho is the eldest of four children of businessman, Ho Eng Hong (born 1926) and Chan Chiew Ping (1931-2005). She has two brothers and a sister. Her sister, Ho Peng, is the chairperson of the Singapore Examinations and Assessment Board, while her brother, Ho Sing, is an executive director of Starhill Global REIT She met her husband, Lee Hsien Loong, the eldest son of former Singapore Prime Minister Lee Kuan Yew, while starting out in her career at the Ministry of Defence together with former prime minister Goh Chok Tong. They married on 17 December 1985 and have two sons, Hongyi and Haoyi. Ho is stepmother to Lee's two children from his first marriage—daughter Xiuqi and son Yipeng.

References

External links
The Singapore Story: Memoirs of Lee Kuan Yew
Lee Kuan Yew | Articles Speeches and Interviews – Lee Kuan Yew 李光耀

1953 births
Living people
Lee family (Singapore)
National Junior College alumni
National University of Singapore alumni
President's Scholars
Recipients of the Pingat Pentadbiran Awam
Recipients of the Bintang Bakti Masyarakat
Singaporean chief executives
Singaporean engineers
Singaporean people of Cantonese descent
Spouses of prime ministers of Singapore
Stanford University alumni
Temasek Holdings people